Arturo Ruiz Castillo (9 December 1910 – 18 June 1994) was a Spanish screenwriter and film director.

Selected filmography
 Devil's Roundup (1952)
 Two Paths (1954)
 Kubala (1955)

References

Bibliography 
 Bentley, Bernard. A Companion to Spanish Cinema. Boydell & Brewer 2008.

External links 
 

1910 births
1994 deaths
Spanish film directors
Spanish male screenwriters
People from Madrid
20th-century Spanish screenwriters
20th-century Spanish male writers